This is a list of radio stations that broadcast on FM frequency 106.0 MHz:

In Germany
 Baden FM

In France
 NRJ

In Greece
 Zita FM

In Indonesia
 106.0 Nikoya FM
 Radio Hang FM (Batam & Singapore)

In Malaysia
 City Plus FM (Seremban frequency)

In Turkey
 Alanya FM Radyo

In the United Arab Emirates
 Radio 2 (Abu Dhabi frequency)

In the United Kingdom
 Greatest Hits Radio South Coast in Isle of Wight
 Gem in the East Midlands
 Heart Wales (Swansea frequency)
 KMFM Canterbury
 Two Lochs Radio (Gairloch frequency)
 Six FM (Cookstown frequency)

References

Lists of radio stations by frequency